The Journal of Maps (JoM) is a biannual open-access peer-reviewed academic journal published by Taylor and Francis. While heavily focused on geography and cartography, the JoM is interdisciplinary and publishes maps and other visualizations of spatial information.

History

See also
American Association of Geographers
Geographic Information Systems
National Council for Geographic Education

References

External links

Cartography journals
English-language journals
Open access journals
Biannual journals